The Lent Bumps 2009 is a series of rowing races held at Cambridge University from Tuesday 24 February 2009 until Saturday 28 February 2009. The event was run as a bumps race and was the 122nd in the series of Lent Bumps which have been held annually in late-February or early March in this form since 1887. See Lent Bumps for the format of the races. 122 crews took part (69 men's crews and 52 women's crews), with nearly 1100 participants in total.

Two clubs changed their names in the 2009 Lent Bumps.  became  reflecting the college name change.  became  reflecting the university's name change in 2005.

Head of the River crews 

  men rowed over each day to retain the headship for a third consecutive year.

  women bumped  on the first day to take the Lents headship for the first time since 2002.

Highest 2nd VIIIs 

  finished as the highest placed men's second VIII, although they dropped into the 2nd division.

  finished as the highest placed women's second VIII, although they dropped into the 2nd division.

Links to races in other years

Bumps Charts 

Below are the bumps charts all 4 men's and all 3 women's divisions, with the men's event on the left and women's event on the right. The bumps chart represents the progress of every crew over all four days of the racing. To follow the progress of any particular crew, simply find the crew's name on the left side of the chart and follow the line to the end-of-the-week finishing position on the right of the chart.

Note that this chart may not be displayed correctly if you are using a large font size on your browser. A simple way to check is to see that the first horizontal bold line, marking the boundary between divisions, lies between positions 17 and 18. The combined Hughes Hall/Lucy Cavendish women's crews are listed as Lucy Cavendish only.

References 

Lent Bumps results
2009 in rowing
2009 in English sport
February 2009 sports events in the United Kingdom